This article lists political parties in Estonia.
Estonia has a multi-party system with numerous parties, in which no one party is likely to gain power alone, and parties must work with each other to form coalition governments.

The parties

Major parties
Parties represented in the Riigikogu or the European Parliament.

Other parties

Former parties
 Agrarian-Center Party (Estonia) (Eestimaa Talupidajate Keskliit)
 Coalition Party and Country Union (Koonderakond ja Maarahva Ühendus)
 Coalition Party and Country Union (Estonian Coalition Party/Estonian Country People's Union) (?)
 Communist Party of Estonia (Eestimaa Kommunistlik Partei)
 Communist Party (on CPSU platform) (Eestimaa Kommunistlik Partei (NLKP platvormil))
 Conservative People's Party of Estonia (1990) (?)
 Constitution Party (Konstitutsioonierakond)
 Democratic Party (Estonia) (?)
 Estonian Biodiversity Party (Elurikkuse Erakond)
 Estonian Christian Democratic Party (?)
 Estonian Christian Democratic Union (?)
 Estonian Christian Democrats (Erakond Eesti Kristlikud Demokraadid)
 Estonian Citizen (?)
 Estonian Country Union (Eesti Maaliit)
 Estonian Democratic Labour Party (Eesti Demokraatlik Tööerakond)
 Estonian Democratic Union (?)
 Estonian Entrepreneurs' Party (?)
 Estonian Free Party (Eesti Vabaerakond) 
 Estonian Greens (Eesti Rohelised)
 Estonian Independence Party (Eesti Iseseisvuspartei)
 Estonian Labour Party (Eesti Tööerakond)
 Estonian Left Party (Eesti Vasakpartei)
 Estonian National Independence Party (Eesti Rahvusliku Sõltumatuse Partei)
 Estonian Party of Pensioners and Families (Eesti Pensionäride ja Perede Erakond)
 Estonian People's Party (Eesti Rahvaerakond)
 Estonian Rural League (Eesti Maarahva Liit)
 Estonian Rural People's Union (Eesti Maarahva Liit)
 Estonian Social Democratic Party (Eesti Sotsiaaldemokraatlik Partei)
 Estonian Social Democratic Independence Party (Eesti Sotsiaaldemokraatlik Iseseisvuspartei)
 Estonian Social Democratic Workers' Party (Eesti Sotsiaaldemokraatlik Tööliste Partei)
 Farmers' Union (Põllumeeste Kogu)
 Free Democratic Party (Estonia) (?)
 Free Estonia (Demokraatlik Ühendus "Vaba Eesti")
 Independent Royalist Party of Estonia (Sõltumatud Kuningriiklased)
 Joint Soviet of Work Collectives (?)
 Liberal People's Party (Estonia) (?)
 Libertas Estonia (Libertas Eesti Erakond)
 Moderate (Social Democratic Party/Country Centre Party) (?)
 National Coalition Party Pro Patria (Rahvuslik Koonderakond "Isamaa")
 New Estonia (Uus Eesti), merged to People's Union of Estonia
 Party of People's Unity (Rahva Ühtsuse Erakond)
 People's Party (Estonia) (?)
 People's Party of Republicans and Conservatives (Vabariiklaste ja Konservatiivide Rahvaerakond)
 Popular Front of Estonia (Rahvarinne)
 Pro Patria Union (Isamaaliit)
 Progress Party (Estonia) (?)
 Progressive Party (Estonia) (?)
 Radical Democratic Party (Estonia) (?)
 Republican Coalition Party (Vabariiklaste Koonderakond)
 Res Publica Party (Erakond Res Publica)
 The Right Wingers (People's Party of Republicans Conservatives) (?)
 RKEI and ERSP (Pro Patria National Coalition and Estonian National Independence Party) (?)
 Russian Social Democratic Party (Vene Sotsiaaldemokraatlik Partei Eestis)
 Swedish People's League (Rootsi Rahvaliit)
 Vaps Movement (Eesti Vabadussõjalaste Keskliit)
 Russian Party in Estonia (Vene Erakond Eestis)

See also
 List of political parties by country
 Liberalism in Estonia

References 

Estonia
 
Political parties
Political parties
Estonia